The Lens, formerly called Patent Lens, is an online patent and scholarly literature search facility, provided by Cambia, an Australia-based non-profit organization. The Lens has been hailed as the “most comprehensive scholarly literature database, that exceeds in its width and depth two leading commercial databases (Web of Science and Scopus) combined”. The Lens is an agglomeration database, that takes bibliometric data from other databases (such as PubMed and Crossref ) and combines them into one, deduplicated and with unified search syntax. Also, unlike the competing databases, The Lens allows data exporting in JSON format with a superior granularity compared to RIS and CSV formats.

Launched in 2000 as the Patent Lens, over the years, thanks to grants from the Rockefeller Foundation in 2000–2004, Bill and Melinda Gates Foundation in 2011, Gordon and Betty Moore Foundation in 2012, The Welcome Trust in 2018, as well as from the Lemelson Foundation it added journal articles, conference papers, reports, books and other types of scholarly literature, and evolved into a comprehensive database with over 225+ million scholarly works, 127+ million global patent records, and more than 370 million biological sequences, all with unprecedentedly rich metadata (including citations).
In 2013, the Patent Lens was officially replaced with Cambia's new site The Lens.

Features
Searches of the Lens can be undertaken using numerous variables, including full-text, title, abstract, inventor, applicant/assignee, publication number and filing number. A user is also able to search for lapsed, abandoned, or expired US patents via the INPADOC patent status and family information service. Patent families may be visualized using graphical trees as PDF files.

The Lens currently links to regulatory data in the form of the United States Food and Drug Administration (FDA) Orange Book: Approved Drug Products with Therapeutic Equivalence Evaluations. Biological sequence data is integrated via links to National Center for Biotechnology Information (NCBI) GenBank and the Patent Lens's own gene sequences. The Patent Lens Sequence Project, commenced in June 2006, provides the only public facility to enable users to explore over 80 million DNA and protein sequences disclosed in patents.

Patent tutorials are available on the site covering patent claims, freedom to operate, patent inventorship, and continuing patent applications. Plant breeders' rights (PBR), also known as plant variety rights (PVR), are also addressed. This has the intention to "forge a learning resource that participants in innovation systems at all levels... can use to learn of critical and timely issues relevant to improving the public good... by engaging with the patent system".

Native language support
The patent search interface is available in Chinese, English and French, with the full text of European Patent Office (EPO) patents being searchable in English, French and German. PCT applications are searchable in Chinese, English, French, German, Japanese, Korean, Russian and Spanish.

Technology landscapes
In addition to the patent search engine, the Lens also hosts a number of "technology landscapes". These landscapes analyse volumes of specialized patent, scientific, technical and business data around particular topics into a more navigable form.

In the field of health and medicine, landscapes have been created for human genome patenting, the influenza genome, the human Telomerase gene, molecular markers outside gene sequences, and adjuvants. For agriculture and the environment, landscapes exist to describe the Agrobacterium-mediated transformation of plants, promoters used to regulate gene expression, antibiotic resistance genes and their uses in plant genetic transformation, resistance to Phosphinothricin, positive selection, bioindicators/ambiosensors, and the rice genome.

Since 2005 the Patent Lens database has been fully navigable, interactive, and updatable by users.

Endorsement
The landscaping activities of the Patent Lens have been endorsed by Dr. Francis Gurry, director general of the World Intellectual Property Organization (WIPO) in March 2009, in "view of the shared objective of making patent information systems more comprehensive and accessible, and turning raw patent data into useful information resources so as to strengthen the empirical basis of international policy processes".

Nature Biotechnology  called the Patent Lens "a giant leap in the right direction" for providing researchers, technology transfer offices and company executives a facile means of establishing the novelty of their offerings and the nature of their competitors' inventions.

See also
 Biological Innovation for Open Society
 Richard Anthony Jefferson
 Digital Science

References

External links
The Lens
 Australian Broadcasting Corporation (ABC) Interview with Richard Anthony Jefferson, Founder and CEO, Cambia

Patent search services